Stefano Galvani  (born 3 June 1977) is a professional male tennis player from San Marino. He is a professional from 1999 and was coached by Patricio Remondegui.

Professional career

He reached a career high of No. 99 ATP Ranking on April 2, 2007 and April 30 of the same year.
During his career, he earned total prize money of $791,336.

He had three appearances in the Davis Cup, two wins and one defeat, in the ties against Portugal and Finland in 2002.

2007
On April 2, 2007, Galvani achieved his career-high singles ranking: World No. 99.

2008
In June, Galvani qualified in singles for the 2008 Wimbledon, beating #222 Yeu-Tzuoo Wang, #148 Andrey Golubev, and #197 Ilija Bozoljac. He was defeated in the second round by world No. 17 Mikhail Youzhny in five sets.

ATP Tour finals

Grand Slam performance timeline

References

External links
 
 
 

1977 births
Living people
Italian male tennis players
Sportspeople from Padua
Sammarinese male tennis players